HMS Hostile (H55) was an H-class destroyer built for the Royal Navy in the 1930s. She was the first and so far only Royal Navy ship to bear the name Hostile. During the Spanish Civil War of 1936–1939 the ship spent considerable time in Spanish waters, enforcing the arms blockade imposed by Britain and France on both sides of the conflict. She was transferred to Freetown, Sierra Leone, in October 1939 to hunt for German commerce raiders in the South Atlantic with Force K. Hostile participated in the First Battle of Narvik in April 1940 and the Battle of Calabria in July 1940. The ship was damaged by a mine off Cape Bon in the Strait of Sicily while on passage from Malta to Gibraltar on 23 August 1940.

Description
Steam for the turbines was provided by three Admiralty 3-drum water-tube boilers. The ship's complement was 137 officers and men in peacetime.

The ship mounted four 45-calibre 4.7-inch (120 mm) Mark IX guns in single mounts. For anti-aircraft defence Hostile had two quadruple Mark I mounts for the 0.5 inch Vickers Mark III machine gun. She was fitted with two above-water quadruple torpedo tube mounts for  torpedoes. One depth charge rail and two throwers were fitted; 20 depth charges were originally carried, but this increased to 35 shortly after the war began.

Service
Hostile was laid down by Scotts Shipbuilding & Engineering Company at Greenock, Scotland, on 27 February 1935, launched on 24 January 1936, and completed on 10 September 1936. Excluding government-furnished equipment like the armament, the ship cost £253,382. She was assigned to the 2nd Destroyer Flotilla of the Mediterranean Fleet upon commissioning. Hostile patrolled Spanish waters in 1937 during the Spanish Civil War enforcing the edicts of the Non-Intervention Committee. The ship received an overhaul at Gibraltar between 17 November and 15 December 1937. She resumed patrolling Spanish waters in 1938 and 1939. After the end of the Spanish Civil War, Hostile was refitted in Sheerness Dockyard between 31 May and 26 July 1939. She returned to the Mediterranean and was in Malta when World War II began.

They refuelled in Rio de Janeiro, Brazil, before proceeding to the estuary of the River Plate in case the damaged German pocket battleship  attempted to escape from Montevideo, Uruguay, where she had taken refuge after losing the Battle of the River Plate. Hostile was overhauled at Chatham Dockyard between 26 January and 29 March 1940 and then rejoined the 2nd Destroyer Flotilla, now assigned to the Home Fleet. Hostile was only hit once, but the shell did little damage. She escorted her badly damaged sister ship, to the repair base set up at Flakstadøya in the Lofoten Islands. Hostile briefly escorted the battleship  before she returned to Rosyth for repairs between 27 April and 4 May. The ship briefly returned to Norwegian waters, where she again escorted Warspite, before being transferred to the Mediterranean Fleet in mid-May.

On 9 July Hostile participated in the Battle of Calabria as an escort for the heavy ships of Force C and unsuccessfully engaged Italian destroyers, suffering no damage. The explosion killed five men and wounded three others. Mohawk took off the survivors while Hero fired two torpedoes to scuttle her.

Notes

Footnotes

References

External links
 Hostile on naval-history.net

 

G and H-class destroyers of the Royal Navy
Ships built on the River Clyde
1935 ships
World War II destroyers of the United Kingdom
World War II shipwrecks in the Mediterranean Sea
Maritime incidents in August 1940
Ships sunk by mines